Luciana Karina Santos de Lima better known by her stage name Luka (born in Porto Alegre, Brazil on 26 June 1979) is a Brazilian singer and songwriter. She has released 4 studio albums.

She started singing and playing guitar at 16 when she was known as Luciana Lima, performed in venues in Rio Grande do Sul. She also appeared in music festivals such as Planeta Atlântica. Besides guitar, she learned piano, music theory and joined a choir called Arapy when she lived in Paraguay for 2 years.
 
Returning to Brazil, she had a big success with the single "Tô Nem Aí" co-written by Luka herself, Latino, Lara Tausz and Alessandro Tausz.

Discography

Albums

Singles

Promotional singles

Awards / Nominations
2003: Won "Song of the Year" for "Tô Nem Aí" in Domingão do Faustão
2004: Won "Song of the Year" for "Tô Nem Aí" at Sistema Brasileiro de Televisão awards
2004: Nominated for "Revelation of the Year" for "Tô Nem Aí" at Sistema Brasileiro de Televisão awards
2009: Won second award for "best interpretation" for "Só o que o coração sangrar" at the 23rd edition of Edição da Moenda da Canção
2010: Nominated for "Voz e Violão" at the 2nd Troféu MZOTV awards

References

External links
Official website

1979 births
Brazilian women pop singers
Living people
People from Porto Alegre
21st-century Brazilian singers
21st-century Brazilian women singers